Zolic (Spanish: Zona Libre de Industria y Comercio) is Guatemalas´ free trade zone for industry and commerce. It is located next to the seaport of Santo Tomás de Castilla in the department of Izabal. It is a logistics and operations centre for international trade. It went into service in 1981. The area comprises 22.000 m2 of stockroom and 53.000 m2 of open terrain .

External links
 official website

Special economic zones
Economy of Guatemala